Sisir Mustafi (born 1 January 1920, date of death unknown) was an Indian cricketer. He played fourteen first-class matches for Bengal between 1941 and 1950.

See also
 List of Bengal cricketers

References

1920 births
Year of death missing
Indian cricketers
Bengal cricketers
Cricketers from Kolkata